Martelli or Martelly is a surname which may refer to:

 Adrienne Martelli (born 1987), American female crew rower from University Place, Washington
 Alessandro Martelli (1876–1934), Italian academic and politician.
 Alex Martelli (born 1955), Italian computer engineer
 Augusto Martelli (1940–2014), Italian composer, conductor, arranger and television personality
 Carlo Martelli (born 1935), English composer
 Claudio Martelli (born 1943), Italian politician
 Danilo Martelli (1927–1949), Italian professional footballer
 Diego Martelli (1839–1896), Italian art critic
 Esmond Martelli (1878–1926), Irish rugby union player
 Francesco Martelli (1633–1717), Italian Roman Catholic cardinal
 Giuseppe Maria Martelli (1678–1741), Italian Roman Catholic archbishop of Florence
 Henri Martelli (1895–1980), French composer
 Sir Horace Martelli (1877–1959), British Army officer 
 John de Martelly (1903–1979), American lithographer, etcher, painter, illustrator
 Manuela Martelli (born 1983), Chilean film and television actress
 Marzio Martelli (born 1971), Italian former professional tennis player
 Michel Martelly (born 1961), Haitian musician, politician and politician; President of Haiti from 14 May 2011 to 7 February 2016
 Otello Martelli (1902–2000), Italian cinematographer
 Phil Martelli (born 1954), American basketball coach
 Raffaele Martelli (1811–1880), Italian priest and Canon
 Ugolino Martelli (died 1523), Roman Catholic prelate, Bishop of Narni and Lecce
 Ugolino Martelli (1860–1934), Italian biologist
 Vera Martelli (1930–2017), Italian sprinter

Italian-language surnames